Ahn Hyeon-beom (Hanja: 安鉉範; born 21 December 1994) is a South Korean football forward who plays for Jeju United in K League 2.

Club career 
Ahn joined Ulsan Hyundai in 2015 and made his league debut against FC Seoul on 8 March 2015.

International career 
He was a member of the South Korea national U-20 team for the 2015 Toulon Tournament.

Club career statistics

External links

References

1994 births
Living people
Association football forwards
South Korean footballers
Ulsan Hyundai FC players
Jeju United FC players
Asan Mugunghwa FC players
K League 1 players
Place of birth missing (living people)